Morwellham Quay is an historic river port in Devon, England that developed to support the local mines. The port had its peak in the Victorian era and is now run as a tourist attraction and museum. It is the terminus of the Tavistock Canal, and has its own copper mine.

The open-air museum includes the restored 19th-century village, the docks and quays, a restored ship, the George and Charlotte copper mine which is toured by a small train, a Victorian farm and a nature reserve with trails.

In July 2006, UNESCO (the cultural arm of the United Nations) awarded World Heritage Site status to the Cornwall and West Devon Mining Landscape area. Morwellham is strategically sited at the centre of the Tamar Valley Mining District which, together with nearby Tavistock, forms the easternmost gateway area to the rest of the World Heritage Site.

The industrial Heritage museum is an Anchor Point of ERIH, The European Route of Industrial Heritage.

History
Morwellham Quay was originally set up by the Benedictine monks of Tavistock Abbey, which was founded in 961, to carry goods to and from Plymouth on the River Tamar, since the River Tavy was unnavigable. By the 12th century, tin ore was being transported through the quay, followed by lead and silver ores in the 13th century. Later, copper deposits were also discovered at the Quay itself and the George and Charlotte Mine opened in the 18th century. In addition, by 1800, manganese deposits were being extracted from the northern and western edges of Dartmoor and being brought to Morwellham.

By the end of the 18th century, the trail of pack horses across the rugged terrain was too much, and in 1817 the 4.5-mile-long Tavistock Canal was opened. The canal included a 1.5-mile tunnel which ended 237 feet above the quay at Morwellham. From here an inclined plane was constructed to bring the iron barges down to the quay, powered by a water wheel.

Morwellham Quay was at its peak during the time Devon Great Consols was in production.  The mine was only four miles north of the port and shipped copper and later arsenic via the quay for a period of almost 60 years beginning in 1844. Morwellham became known as the "richest Copper port in Queen Victoria's Empire", and the queen herself visited in 1856. Another inclined plane was built to transport the ore down the hill and a new quay was added to handle the 30,000 tons of ore that were exported each year. Arsenic was also extracted and it became the world's largest supplier of the mineral in the latter part of the century. However, by 1903 the Consols' wealth was exhausted and the mines closed.

By this stage, the railways had taken over and Morwellham's usefulness was also ended. The canal tunnel was used as a water supply for a hydroelectric plant and the inclined planes were abandoned.

In 2009 Devon County Council withdrew funding for the mining museum, which as a direct result was placed into administration. In April 2010 the site was purchased by the owners of Bicton Park, and it reopened to the public later in the year.

Industrial heritage
The site has been imaginatively preserved to give an impression of Victorian industrial and rural life.  The assayers' offices have been carefully preserved and Victorian cottages, farm and schoolrooms presented. The ore-crushing plants driven by a 32-foot overhead waterwheel can be seen. A battery electric-powered tramway, constructed as part of the tourist attraction in the 1970s, takes visitors for tours on a single level of the copper mine. There is also an extensive ecological programme of visits to explore the valley by water and land. Old lime kilns can also be seen.

The three areas by the tunnel are listed as the bulk of sources of copper in the county in Lysons' guide to each county of Britain in the 1820s and the county's derived wealth from this metal alone were as follows:

Edwardian Farm 
The BBC television series Edwardian Farm was filmed at Morwellham Quay during 2009/2010.

See also 
New Quay (Devon) – A similar port slightly downstream, now abandoned.
Calstock
Harewood House, Calstock

References

Further reading
Booker, Frank (1967) The Industrial Archaeology of the Tamar Valley. Newton Abbot: David & Charles; Revised impression 1971

External links

Morwellham Quay Official website
BBC Devon website
Cornish Mining website

European Route of Industrial Heritage Anchor Points
Industrial archaeological sites in Devon
Tourist attractions in Devon
Redeveloped ports and waterfronts in England
Geology of Devon
Museums in Devon
Mining museums in England
Open-air museums in England
Mining in Devon
River Tamar
Lime kilns in England